Joe's Shanghai is a chain of seven Shanghainese restaurants in the United States and Japan. The original location was opened by restaurateur Mei Ping "Barbara" Matsumura and chef Kiu Sang "Joe" Si in 1995 in Flushing, Queens, followed by branches in Manhattan Chinatown and Midtown Manhattan. There are four locations in Japan, two in Tokyo, one in Osaka and one in Sendai. Ms. Matsumura has opened over a dozen restaurants in the New York City area, including the popular Haru sushi chain, while Chef Si also opened Joe's Ginger one block from the Manhattan Chinatown location of Joe's Shanghai, building on the original concept but incorporating the influence of other Chinese cuisines, most notably from Hong Kong.

Xiaolongbao
The most famous dish at Joe's Shanghai is the pork or crab meat xiaolongbao, a type of small Chinese steam bun, in which the soup is encased inside the dumpling. This is achieved by chilling a highly gelatinous soup and wrapping it in the dough while solid. When the buns are later steamed, the solids melt back into liquid soup within the outer bun casing.

Reviews and media
In 1996, Ruth Reichl of the New York Times gave Joe's Shanghai two stars out of four.

Currently, Zagat gives it a food rating of 4.2 out of 5.

In a friendly bet between New York City Mayor Michael Bloomberg and Boston Mayor Thomas Menino over the outcome of the 2003 American League Championship between the Boston Red Sox and New York Yankees, Mayor Bloomberg wagered one of his favorite foods from each borough of New York City. For the borough of Manhattan, he chose two dozen soup dumplings from Joe's Shanghai.

See also
 List of Chinese restaurants

References

External links

Chinese-American culture in New York City
Restaurants established in 1995
Restaurants in Manhattan
Chinese restaurants in New York (state)
Restaurants in New York City
Chinatown, Manhattan
Flushing, Queens
Midtown Manhattan
1995 establishments in New York City